Knud George Pedersen,  (born June 13, 1931) is a Canadian academic administrator.
He was the president of Simon Fraser University (1979 to 1983), University of British Columbia (1983 to 1985), University of Western Ontario (1985 to 1994), interim president of the University of Northern British Columbia, and founding president of Royal Roads University (1995-). He served as chancellor of the University of Northern British Columbia from 1998 until 1999.

Biography
Born in Three Creeks, Alberta, Pedersen received his B.A. from the University of British Columbia, an M.A. from the University of Washington, and his Ph.D. in Education from the University of Chicago in 1968.

In 1992, he was made an Officer of the Order of Canada for being "devoted to the cause of higher education." In 1994, he was awarded the Order of Ontario. In 2002, he was awarded the Order of British Columbia.

In 2005, he was appointed Chair of the Board of Governors of Emily Carr Institute.

References

 

1931 births
Living people
Canadian university and college chancellors
Presidents of the University of British Columbia
Members of the Order of British Columbia
Officers of the Order of Canada
Members of the Order of Ontario
Canadian people of Danish descent
University of British Columbia alumni
University of Chicago alumni
University of Washington alumni
Presidents of the University of Western Ontario